The Royal Marine Barracks, Woolwich was a military installation occupied by the Royal Marines and located in Frances Street, just south of Woolwich Dockyard. After the Royal Marines' departure from Woolwich it was renamed Cambridge Barracks, while the adjacent Royal Marine Infirmary was renamed Red Barracks.

Royal Marine Barracks

The Woolwich Division of the Royal Marines was established, as part of the response to the threat created by the Napoleonic Wars, in 1805. New barracks for marines, who provided a military presence in the Dockyard, were established east of Frances Street in 1808. Bowater Cottage, which had been built in the 1790s, became the home of the Colonel Commandant of the barracks in 1812. The barracks were re-built, to a design developed Captain William Denison RE, between 1842 and 1848. They were of an enlightened design for their time, built to provide even the lowest-ranked inhabitants with sufficient light, space and fresh air. Rushgrove House, which had been built in 1806, became the home of the Colonel Commandant of the barracks in 1855.

Cambridge Barracks
After the closure of the Dockyard and the consequential disbanding of the Woolwich Division of the Royal Marines in 1869, these Royal Marine Barracks were renamed Cambridge Barracks, after the Commander-in-Chief of the Forces, Prince George, Duke of Cambridge, and used by the British Army as additional troop accommodation. Having become surplus to requirements, the barracks were demolished in 1972, but the heavily rusticated gatehouse arch remains on Frances Street, serving as a community centre and police office.

Royal Marine Infirmary

Alongside the barracks had stood the red-brick Royal Marine Infirmary designed by William Scamp and built between 1858 and 1860; it was (along with Blackburn Infirmary) one of the first two pavilion-plan hospitals to be erected in England in the wake of the Crimean War. The infirmary, situated on a hill, was "the most conspicuous and striking feature of the town of Woolwich."

Red Barracks
After the closure of the Dockyard in 1869 the infirmary also passed to the British Army. Renamed Red Barracks, reflecting the original red brick design, the old infirmary building accommodated the Army Ordnance Corps (later the Royal Army Ordnance Corps) until 1921 when the corps moved its headquarters to Hilsea Barracks near Portsmouth. From 1885 Red Barracks also accommodated Artillery College (known as Ordnance College from 1899 to 1918). After the departure of the RAOC the college expanded to fill the whole of Red Barracks; renamed the Military College of Science in 1927, the college moved to Shrivenham in 1939. Red Barracks then became the home of the Inspectorate of Armaments (later the Quality Assurance Directorate (Weapons)) and also accommodated the Royal Artillery Record Office from 1940; it was decommissioned by the British Army in 1967 and, despite being a listed building, it too was demolished in 1975. The perimeter walls, which date back to the 1850s, survive.

References

Sources

Barracks in England
Royal
Royal Marines bases